Bruchwałd  is a settlement in the administrative district of Gmina Purda, within Olsztyn County, Warmian-Masurian Voivodeship, in northern Poland. It is located in Warmia.

References

Villages in Olsztyn County